Jiří Valter, (born 6 February 1952) better known as Big Boss, is the vocalist for the Czech black metal band Root, the progressive metal band Equirhodont, and Big Boss Band, which mainly performs ballads.

Biography
Valter was born in Czechoslovakia in 1952  to pianist and professor Milan Valter. He started out as a blues vocalist before moving on to hard rock and eventually metal. According to him, "[a]ll these styles are mixed, either in some of my songs or singing. Mostly in my singing". In late 1987, he founded the black metal band Root together with guitarist Blackie.

Big Boss launched his side project Equirhodont with Root bandmates Ashok and Igor in 2002. In addition to his activities with these two bands, he has also recorded four solo albums.

Beliefs
Valter founded the Czech branch of the Church of Satan in 1991. He claims to have been appointed a High Priest in the Church of Satan by Anton LaVey. He still lives his life according to Satanism but delegated the branch's leadership to younger members around 2004 and now believes that "everything that smells of organization is shit".

Rumours have frequently circulated about him being gay. He has denied this and stated: "...if they say that I'm homosexual, it is their problem, not mine. Perhaps it is their wishful thinking. Perhaps when they masturbate, they fantasise about me and I'm an unattainable idol for them... really I don't know."

Discography

with Root

 7 černých jezdců / 666 (single, 1990)
 Zjevení (1990)
 Hell Symphony (1991)
 The Revelation (1991)
 The Temple in the Underworld (1992)
 Kärgeräs (1996)
 The Book (1999)
 Black Seal (2001)
 Dema (2002)
 Madness of the Graves (2003)
 Casilda (2006)
 Daemon viam invenient (2007)
 Heritage of Satan (2011)
 Viginti Quinque Annis in Scaena (2013)
 Kärgeräs – Return from Oblivion (2016)

with Equirhodont
 Grandiose Magus (2003)
 Black Crystal (2004)

Solo
 Q7 (1994)
 Belial's Wind (1998)
 Doomy Ballads (2009)
 Sbírka černých růží (2017)

Selected guest performances
 "At the Image of Pain" Memorial (Moonspell, 2006)
 "Oaken Dragons" and "The Thrall and the Master" The Journeys and Experiences of Death (Helheim, 2006)
  "Jáma pekel" (Master's Hammer cover) Ezkaton (Behemoth, 2008)

References

External links

 

1952 births
Living people
Czech Satanists
20th-century Czech male singers
Czech heavy metal singers
Heavy metal singers
Black metal singers
Czech heavy metal musicians
21st-century Czech male singers